USS Spoonbill (AMS/MSC-202) was a  acquired by the US Navy for clearing coastal minefields.

Construction
Spoonbill  was laid down 2 November 1953, by Tampa Marine Company, Tampa, Florida; launched on 3 August 1954, as AMS-202; sponsored by Mrs. A. N. Springer; redesignated as MSC-202 on 7 February 1955; and commissioned on 14 June 1955.

East Coast operations 
Spoonbill was among the first in a group of non-magnetic minesweepers of wooden construction capable of sweeping any conventional type mine constructed at the time. On 4 July 1955, she was assigned to United States Mine Force, Atlantic Fleet, Charleston, South Carolina. After shakedown training off Key West, Florida, from 26 July to 24 August, and post-shakedown availability at Rawles Brothers' Shipyard, Jacksonville, Florida, Spoonbill returned to Charleston.

Schoolship assignment 
She steamed from Charleston on 3 February 1956, for Yorktown, Virginia, where she was assigned duty with the Naval Mine Warfare School, embarking students for daily cruises to participate in minesweeping operations and training with fleet units.

The ship sailed for Argentia, Newfoundland, on 8 January 1957, and participated in fleet exercises from 15 January to 7 February, when she returned to Charleston. Spoonbill operated from there until 4 February 1958, when she got underway for the US West Coast. The minesweeper transited the Panama Canal on 11 February, and arrived at San Diego, California, on 28 February. She moved up the coast to Treasure Island, California, and conducted operations from there until 2 February 1959.

Decommissioning 
Ordered back to the US East Coast, Spoonbill arrived at Norfolk on 9 March, to enter the navy yard for an overhaul in preparation for transfer to Spain. Spoonbill was struck from the Navy List on 16 June 1959, and transferred to Spain on 1 July, under the Military Assistance Program. She served the Spanish Navy as Duero (M-28). Duero was struck from the Spanish Navy List, 16 December 1999. Fate: unknown.

Notes 

Citations

Bibliography 

Online resources

External links 
 Dictionary of American Naval Fighting Ships

 

Bluebird-class minesweepers
Ships built in Tampa, Florida
1954 ships
Cold War minesweepers of the United States
Minesweepers of the Spanish Navy
Adjutant-class minesweepers